Wilbur "Ashes" Jackson was an American Negro league shortstop between 1909 and 1912.

Jackson played for the Kansas City Giants from 1909 to 1911, and for the Kansas City Royal Giants in 1912. In 31 recorded career games, he posted 30 hits in 131 plate appearances.

References

External links
Baseball statistics and player information from Baseball-Reference Black Baseball Stats and Seamheads

Year of birth missing
Year of death missing
Place of birth missing
Place of death missing
Kansas City Giants players
Kansas City Royal Giants players